Collar may refer to:

Human neckwear
Clerical collar (informally dog collar), a distinctive collar used by the clergy of some Christian religious denominations
Collar (clothing), the part of a garment that fastens around or frames the neck
Collar (jewelry), an ornament for the neck
Collar (order), a symbol of membership in various chivalric orders
Designation of workers by collar color
Livery collar, including Collar of Esses, worn around the neck and shoulders as a mark of office
Ruff (clothing), a type of collar worn in Western Europe from the mid-sixteenth century to the mid-seventeenth century
Slave collar
Collar (BDSM), a device of any material placed around the neck of the submissive partner in BDSM

Animal collars
Collar (animal), a strap around an animal's neck to which a leash or tag may be attached
Dog collar, a piece of material put around the neck of a dog
Cat collar, a piece of material put around the neck of a cat
Elizabethan collar, a protective device round the neck and head of an animal
Flea collar or insect-repellent collar, an animal collar impregnated with pesticide
Horse collar, means of transferring pulling effort of draught horse to its load
Shock collar, an animal-training collar which creates an electric shock
Tracking collar, a collar which uses a radio beacon or GPS to allow an animal to be tracked

Other uses
Cervical collar, a medical device worn round the neck to support the head
 Collar, collar beam or collar tie, a structural element in roof framing between two rafters
Collar (baseball), jargon for a player getting no hits in a game
Collar (film), a 2014 Canadian horror film
Collar (finance), a combination of an equal number of call and put options at slightly different exercise prices
Police slang for an arrest
Shaft collar or drill collar, a piece of hardware used on power transmission devices as a mechanical stop, locating device, or bearing face
Collar (group), a Hong Kong Cantopop girl group
 "The Collar", a song by Mr and Mrs Smith and Mr Drake from Mr and Mrs Smith and Mr Drake

Names
F Collar, a business established in 1932 manufacturing oars, masts and spars

See also
Collard (disambiguation)